Shrewsbury Railroad Station, Stewartstown Railroad is a historic railroad station located at Shrewsbury, York County, Pennsylvania.  It was built in c. 1910, and is a one-story, three bay by four bay brick building built by the Stewartstown Railroad. It has a hipped roof that extends over a porch.  It was used as both a freight and passenger station. It is currently being renovated by the railroad for eventual use for excursion service. 

It was added to the National Register of Historic Places in 1995.

References

Railway stations on the National Register of Historic Places in Pennsylvania
Railway stations in the United States opened in 1910
Transportation buildings and structures in York County, Pennsylvania
National Register of Historic Places in York County, Pennsylvania